Julius C. McHaskell (July 31, 1902 – March 1970) was an American Negro league first baseman in the 1920s.

A native of Pine Bluff, Arkansas, McHaskell made his Negro leagues debut in 1926 with the Memphis Red Sox. He went on to play three more seasons with Memphis through 1929. McHaskell died in Detroit, Michigan in 1970 at age 67.

References

External links
 and Seamheads
 J.C. McHaskell at Arkansas Baseball Encyclopedia

1902 births
1970 deaths
Date of death missing
Memphis Red Sox players
Baseball pitchers
Baseball players from Arkansas
Sportspeople from Pine Bluff, Arkansas
20th-century African-American sportspeople